Oh Myung Hee (born 1956) is a Korean visual artist.

Biography 
Oh Myung Hee is a graduate of Sejong University. She holds an honorary professorship from the College of Art & Design at Suwon University, South Korea. 

Known for her three-dimensional works, videos, and multimedia, Oh Myung Hee has exhibited extensively in the Far East and Western Europe, including a solo exhibition at London’s Saatchi Gallery, the Kaze Gallery in Osaka, the Galerie Bhak, (Bhak Young-Duk) in Seoul, and at Espace Miromesnil in Paris.

She was selected to participate in the Personal Structures exhibition by the European Cultural Centre at the 59th Venice Biennale.

References

External links
 
 Interview with Diplomatic World Institute

Sejong University alumni

1956 births
Living people